Vigo-Guixar railway station is a railway station in Vigo, (province of Pontevedra), Spain. Originally the site of a freight depot for the port of Vigo, on the wharf of the same name, it serves as the temporary terminal for all trains into Vigo during the construction of the new Vialia Vigo station - replacing Vigo-Urzaiz.

The terminal serves passengers travelling on Renfe's middle-distance service (Media Distancia) running across the autonomous community of Galicia.

History

Construction
The contract for the construction of the station was awarded by the Ministry of Public Works to the Galician construction company Copasa with an estimated budget of 10.6 million euros - this would eventually rise to 17.5 million.

The station was inaugurated on 27 August 2011 by José Blanco, the Minister of Public Works, and Abel Caballero, the mayor of Vigo

Services

References

External links

 Vigo-Guixar station listing at Adif website

Railway stations in Galicia (Spain)
Railway stations in Spain opened in 2011
Vigo
Buildings and structures in the Province of Pontevedra